The Northman is a 2022 American epic historical action thriller film directed by Robert Eggers, who co-wrote the screenplay with Sjón. Based on the legend of Amleth, the film stars Alexander Skarsgård (who also produced), Nicole Kidman, Claes Bang, Anya Taylor-Joy, Ethan Hawke, Björk and Willem Dafoe. The plot centers on Amleth, a Viking prince who sets out on a quest to avenge the murder of his father. The film is heavily influenced by Norse mythology.

Skarsgård had wanted to make a Viking film for several years, and Eggers decided to make the film his third project after the pair met to discuss possible collaborations. Much of the cast joined in October 2019, and filming took place in locations throughout Northern Ireland, the Republic of Ireland and Iceland from August to December 2020.

The Northman had its world premiere in Stockholm at Rigoletto Cinema on March 28, 2022. It began theatrical release in some countries on April 13, 2022, and was released theatrically in the United States on April 22 to critical acclaim, with praise for its direction, screenplay, cinematography and the performances of Skarsgård, Kidman and Bang. Although the film had underperformed at the worldwide box office, it later found financial success at the VOD and other post-theatrical markets.

Plot

In AD 895, King Aurvandill returns to the island of Hrafnsey, reuniting with his wife, Queen Gudrún, and his heir, Prince Amleth. To prepare Amleth for his eventual ascension, the father and son participate in a ceremony overseen by Aurvandill's jester, Heimir. Heimir tells Amleth that his destiny is fixed and cannot be escaped, and Amleth vows to avenge his father if Aurvandill is ever slain, rather than live his life in shame. The next morning, Amleth's bastard uncle Fjölnir stages a palace coup, personally beheads Aurvandill, sacks the hillfort and carries away Gudrún. Amleth narrowly escapes Fjölnir's assassins and flees by boat, swearing vengeance.

Years later, an adult Amleth is a berserker within a band of Vikings. After attacking a village in Garðaríki (Gardariki), Amleth encounters a Seeress in the temple of Svetovit; the Seeress orders Amleth to remember his oath of vengeance and tells him that his fate is intertwined with that of a Maiden-King. Soon after, Amleth learns that "Fjölnir the Brotherless" has lost his throne to Harald of Norway and now lives as a sheep farmer in Iceland. Posing as a slave, Amleth sneaks aboard a ship taking slaves to Iceland. He encounters an enslaved Slavic woman named Olga, who claims to be a sorceress. They are taken to Fjölnir's farm, where Amleth learns his mother has married Fjölnir and borne him a son named Gunnar.

One night, Amleth follows a vixen and encounters a he-witch, who facilitates a spiritual dialogue between Amleth and the skull of Heimir, whom Fjölnir has also murdered. Heimir tells Amleth about Draugr, a magical sword that can only be drawn at the Gates of Hel. Amleth enters a mound and obtains the blade after fighting its owner, the undead Mound Dweller. He hides the sword upon his return to the farm. The next day, Amleth is selected to compete in a game of knattleikr against another farm. The game turns violent and Gunnar is almost killed, but Amleth saves him. As a reward, Fjölnir's adult son, Thorir, grants him overseer duties and allows him to choose a woman.

During the evening celebrations, Amleth and Olga make love; they promise to overcome Fjölnir together. Over several nights Amleth kills prominent members of Fjölnir's estate, and Olga mixes the food supply with fly agaric, a potent hallucinogen. The ensuing chaos allows Amleth to enter Fjölnir's house. Amleth reveals his identity to Gudrún, who replies that she was Aurvandil's slave and that Amleth was conceived by rape. Gudrún also reveals that she masterminded Fjölnir's coup because she wanted both Aurvandill and Amleth dead; she then tries to seduce Amleth, who, after a moment, rejects her. Enraged, Amleth kills Thorir, and cuts out his heart.

Gudrún reveals Amleth's true identity to Fjölnir and calls for the death of her eldest son. Fjölnir decides to kill Olga, but Amleth offers to trade Olga's life for Thorir's heart. Unable to draw Draugr, Amleth is captured. After a severe beating, Amleth is released from his restraints by a flock of ravens sent by Odin and Olga rescues him. Amleth decides to abandon his quest for revenge, and the two decide to escape by boat to his kinsmen in the Orkney Islands. But aboard the vessel Amleth discovers that Olga is pregnant with twins, one of whom will be the Maiden-King prophesied by the Seeress. Realizing that Olga and their children will never be safe while Fjölnir lives, Amleth, despite Olga's pleas, jumps overboard and swims ashore reasoning that he cannot escape his fate.

Back at the farm, Amleth kills Fjölnir's remaining men and frees the slaves. While searching for Fjölnir, Amleth is attacked by Gudrún and Gunnar and kills them in self-defense after being severely wounded. Fjölnir, discovering his wife and son dead, coldly tells Amleth to meet him at the Gates of Hel: the crater of the volcano Hekla. Amleth and Fjölnir engage in a fierce Holmgang naked until Fjölnir is beheaded and Amleth is fatally stabbed simultaneously. As he lies dying, Amleth has a vision of Olga embracing their two children, whom she tells him are safe, before urging him to let go. A valkyrie carries Amleth through the gates of Valhöll (Valhalla).

Cast

Production

Development
Born to a Swedish family, Alexander Skarsgård had been fascinated with Viking history and mythology since childhood, and had long sought a Viking-themed project with the help of producer Lars Knudsen. In 2011, Skarsgård was attached to a Warner Bros. epic with the working title The Vanguard, which ultimately did not materialize. Robert Eggers became interested in making a Viking film following a 2016 trip to Iceland with his wife Alexandra Shaker, who is a fan of Old Norse sagas. During the trip, Eggers met Björk, who in turn introduced him to Sjón. In 2017, Skarsgård met Eggers to discuss future projects, but the discussion quickly turned to a Viking Age–themed film. Eggers subsequently reached out to Sjón, and the two began researching and writing the screenplay.

The story of The Northman was based primarily on the legend of Amleth as written by Danish historian Saxo Grammaticus, known as the direct inspiration for William Shakespeare's Hamlet. Eggers cited the Poetic Edda, the Prose Edda, Egil's Saga, Grettir's Saga, the Eyrbyggja saga and the Saga of Hrolfr Kraki as additional influences.  Archaeologist Neil Price at Uppsala University, folklorist Terry Gunnell at the University of Iceland and Viking historian Jóhanna Katrín Friðriksdóttir served as historical consultants on the film. Eggers also acknowledged Conan the Barbarian as a source of inspiration.

In October 2019, it was announced that Eggers would direct an epic Viking revenge saga, which he would also co-write with Sjón. Skarsgård, Nicole Kidman, Anya Taylor-Joy, Bill Skarsgård (Alexander's brother) and Willem Dafoe were in talks to join the film. They would all be confirmed in December, along with the addition of Claes Bang to the cast. The film was officially in preparation in December 2019, and would begin filming in Belfast in 2020. In August 2020, Björk, along with her daughter Ísadóra "Doa" Barney, Kate Dickie and Ethan Hawke joined the cast of the film. In September 2020, Bill Skarsgård announced he had dropped out of the film due to scheduling conflicts and was replaced with Gustav Lindh.

Filming
Principal photography was to begin in March 2020, but it was halted due to the COVID-19 pandemic. Filming, most of which took place in Northern Ireland, started in August 2020 and wrapped early in December, lasting 87 days. King Aurvandill's village was constructed at Torr Head on the coast of County Antrim, while Fjölnir's farm was built at Knockdhu near Larne. The scenes in the Land of the Rus were filmed at Portglenone, the Clandeboye Estate, Shane's Castle and on the River Bann. The Hightown quarry outside Belfast stood for the volcano Hekla, where the film's climactic fight takes place. Brief sequences were filmed in Iceland at the Svínafellsjökull glacier and the town of Akureyri.

Post-production
The film cost between $70–90 million to produce, which was higher than its original $65 million budget. Eggers found the editing process to be the most difficult of his career. Feedback from test screenings indicated that the film's first act was too slow. More feedback showed that audiences found the Old Norse dialogue difficult to understand, which resulted in most of it being replaced in ADR sessions. The final cut was eventually approved on November 3, 2021.

Music 

For the film's score, Eggers brought former Tri Angle record label artists, Robin Carolan and Sebastian Gainsborough  Vessel, for composition and production. They researched extensively on the history of Vikings music, including discussions with ethnographer Poul Høxbro, and used instruments based on Nordic folk music, such as tagelharpa, langspil, kravik lyre, and säckpipa. They further experimented with the instruments they had, to create that ethnic Nordic sound, which includes the 40-member string ensemble mimicking the sound of an archaic instrument called bullroarer.

The score album was released by Back Lot Music on April 15, 2022 and featured 43 tracks. On July 1, Sacred Bones Records released the album in CD, vinyl and cassettes.

Marketing 
The film's advertising campaign briefly attracted notoriety due to a series of posters commissioned for the New York subway system that neglected to include the film's title. Within a day of the subject going viral on Twitter, the posters were removed. The film's advertising campaign additionally sponsored an episode of the web series Death Battle, with the midway segment of the episode featuring its characters interacting with the film and one of its axes.

Tie-in media
A 160-page book written by Simon Abrams and Eggers about the film's production and research, titled The Northman: A Call to the Gods, was originally scheduled to be released on September 6, 2022, but was later pushed back to November 8.

Release

Theatrical
The Northman was originally scheduled to be released on April 8, 2022, but was later pushed back to April 22. It was distributed by Focus Features in United States and by Universal Pictures internationally. Special screenings were held in several cities worldwide ahead of the theatrical release: in Stockholm at Rigoletto Cinema on March 28, in Hamburg at Astor Film Lounge on March 30, in Rome at Cinema Troisi on April 1, in London at Odeon Luxe Leicester Square on April 5, in Belfast at Cineworld on April 6 and in Los Angeles at TCL Chinese Theatre on April 18. Wide releases began early in some countries: on April 13 in Denmark, Norway and Sweden; on April 14 in Czech Republic, Ecuador, Iceland, Mexico, Netherlands, Slovakia, Slovenia and Uruguay; and on April 15 in the United Kingdom and Lithuania.

Home media
The Northman was released on VOD on May 13, 2022, on digital on June 6, 2022, and on Blu-ray, DVD and Ultra HD Blu-ray on June 7, 2022, by Universal Pictures Home Entertainment in the United States.

Reception

Box office
The Northman grossed $34.2 million in the United States and Canada, and $35.4 million in other territories – for a worldwide total of $69.6 million.

In the U.S. and Canada, The Northman was released alongside The Bad Guys and The Unbearable Weight of Massive Talent, and was projected to gross $8–15 million from 3,223 theaters in its opening weekend. It made $5 million on its first day, including $1.4 million from Thursday night previews. The film went on to debut to $12.3 million in its opening weekend, finishing fourth at the box office. Deadline Hollywood noted that The Northman and The Unbearable Weight of Massive Talent were targeting the same demographic, which impacted their debuts. The film earned $6.4 million in its second weekend, finishing fourth; $2.9 million in its third weekend, finishing sixth; $1.75 million in its fourth weekend, finishing seventh; and $1.1 million in its fifth weekend, finishing 10th. It dropped out of the box office top 10 in its sixth weekend with $249,660.

Outside of the U.S. and Canada, the film earned $3.4 million from 15 international markets in its opening weekend. It made $6.3 million in its second weekend after expanding to 41 markets, $4.5 million in its third weekend, $2.2 million in its fourth, $2.5 million in its fifth, $2.9 million in its sixth, and $1.4 million in its seventh.

Home media performance 
Eggers commented on the film's underwhelming box office, stating that "[The film] met the expectations of a bad marketplace ... Am I disappointed that, three to four weeks in, we're on VOD because that's the way things are done in the post-COVID world? Yeah. But it's doing great on VOD, so there you go." In its debut weekend on PVOD in the U.S., the film was the top-rented title on iTunes, third on Vudu and fourth on Google Play, making about the same amount of revenue as The Bad Guys and The Lost City despite grossing much less than both in theaters. IndieWire wrote that "The Northman looks like the type of film that, even with lower theatrical returns, is greatly elevated by that exposure." The following week, it finished third on the iTunes and Vudu charts, and fifth on Google Play. 

In its debut week on the DVD/Blu-ray market, the film debuted at the No. 1 spot on both the NPD VideoScan First Alert chart (which tracks combined DVD and Blu-ray disc unit sales) and the Blu-ray disc sales chart for the week ending June 11, 2022. 

Focus Features' president of production and acquisitions, Kiska Higgs, later stated that the film did become profitable despite press speculations.

Critical response
The review aggregator Rotten Tomatoes reported an approval rating of 90% based on 372 reviews, with an average rating of 7.7/10. The website's critical consensus reads, "A bloody revenge epic and breathtaking visual marvel, The Northman finds filmmaker Robert Eggers expanding his scope without sacrificing any of his signature style." Metacritic assigned the film a weighted average score of 82 out of 100 based on 60 critics, indicating "universal acclaim." Audiences polled by CinemaScore gave the film an average grade of "B" on an A+ to F scale, while PostTrak gave it a 75% positive score (with an average 3.5 out of 5 stars), with 56% saying they would definitely recommend it.

The Guardian's Peter Bradshaw gave a 5 out of 5 score, praising the film's nihilistic tone and performances by the cast, stating that "It's entirely outrageous, with some epic visions of the flaring cosmos. I couldn't look away." Digital Spy's Gabriella Geisinger gave a 5 out of 5 score and praised Eggers's visionary direction and the film's grisly and surreal atmosphere, claiming that "The world created in The Northman is so totally absorbing". MovieZine's Alexander Kardelo gave the film a 4 out of 5 score and particularly praised Skarsgård's performance and Eggers' direction. IndieWire's David Ehrlich called the film "primal, sinewy, gnarly-as-fuck," "grab-you-by-the-throat intense" and "never dull." Games Radar’s Matt Maytum commented that the film is a "truly distinctive, unmissable epic" in his review, ultimately giving it a 5 out of 5 stars. The Independents Clarrise Loughrey gave a 5 out of 5 stars and stated in her review that the film was a "beautiful risk". RogerEbert.coms Robert Daniels gave a 3 out of 4 score and praised the direction, cinematography and cast performances, but found that the film "often stumbles when it searches for profundity." The Austin Chronicles Richard Whittaker called the film an "extraordinary feat of cinema," commending the direction. The New York Timess A.O. Scott praised the world-building and cinematography, writing, "Eggers's accomplishment lies in his fastidious, fanatical rendering of that world, down to its bed linens and cooking utensils." The New Yorker's Richard Brody found that the film "offers no synesthesia, no evocation of any sense beside vision" and criticized Eggers's direction, ultimately concluding, "The Northman merely serves up its raw material both half-baked and overcooked." Rolling Stone's K. Austin Collins wrote that "It’s an oft-stunning visual feast," but added, "It is also an instructive example of how the most visionary intentions can't always enliven an otherwise rote story."

Accolades

Notes

References

External links
 Official website
 
 
 Official screenplay

2022 action drama films
2022 drama films
2022 films
2020s historical drama films
American films about revenge
American action drama films
American historical drama films
American epic films
Amleth
Film productions suspended due to the COVID-19 pandemic
Films about princes
Films about slavery
Films based on European myths and legends
Films based on Norse mythology
Films directed by Robert Eggers
Films set on farms
Films set in Iceland
Films set in the 9th century
Films set in the 10th century
Films set in the Viking Age
Films shot in County Donegal
Films shot in Northern Ireland
Focus Features films
Regency Enterprises films
Films about dysfunctional families
Incest in film
Films produced by Arnon Milchan
2020s American films